The United States Nordic Combined Championships 2010 took place on October 10, 2009 in Lake Placid, New York. Todd Lodwick won the race.

Results

References 
 Results on the U.S. Ski Team's website.

2010 in Nordic combined
2010 in American sports
United States Nordic Combined Championships